Hestimidius is a genus of beetles in the family Cerambycidae, containing the following species:

 Hestimidius humeralis Breuning, 1939
 Hestimidius ingranulatus Breuning, 1939
 Hestimidius ochreosignatus Breuning, 1939

References

Apomecynini
Cerambycidae genera
Taxa named by Stephan von Breuning (entomologist)